Whole may refer to:

Music
 Whole note, or semibreve
 Whole step, or major second
 Whole (Jessa Anderson album) or the title song, 2014
 Whole (Soil album), 2013
 Whole, an EP by Pedro the Lion, 1997
 "Whole", a song by Basement from Colourmeinkindness, 2012
 "Whole", a song by Flaw from Through the Eyes, 2001
 "Whole", a song by Jacob Whitesides, 2019

Other uses
 Whole (campaign), a British anti-stigma mental health campaign
 Whole (film), a 2003 American documentary by Melody Gilbert
 Whole milk, milk which has not had fat removed

See also
 Holism, a philosophical and social theory